The 1966–67 Yorkshire Football League was the 41st season in the history of the Yorkshire Football League, a football competition in England.

Division One

Division One featured 13 clubs which competed in the previous season, along with four new clubs, promoted from Division Two:
Kiveton Park
Norton Woodseats
Sheffield
Thorne Colliery

League table

Map

Division Two

Division Two featured eleven clubs which competed in the previous season, along with six new clubs.
Clubs relegated from Division One:
Rawmarsh Welfare
Stocksbridge Works
Plus:
Bradford City 'A'
Hamptons Sports
Micklefield Welfare, joined from the West Yorkshire League
York City reserves, joined from the North Regional League

League table

Map

League Cup

Final

References

1966–67 in English football leagues
Yorkshire Football League